The men's triple jump competition at the 1968 Summer Olympics in Mexico City, Mexico took place on October 16–17. Thirty-four athletes from 24 nations competed. The maximum number of athletes per nation had been set at 3 since the 1930 Olympic Congress. The event was won by Viktor Saneyev of the Soviet Union, the first time the nation had won gold in the event (though the fifth consecutive Games in which the Soviets had won at least one medal). Saneyev began a decade of dominating the Olympic triple jump; he would win again in 1972 and 1976 as well as taking silver in 1980. Nelson Prudêncio's silver was Brazil's first medal in the event since 1956; Giuseppe Gentile's bronze was Italy's first men's triple jump medal ever.

Summary

With the best athletes jumping at high altitude in the Olympics, the world record was set multiple times. Prior to the event, Józef Szmidt had held the world record for eight years and also held the Olympic record since the previous Olympics.

The world and Olympic record were smashed in the qualifying round by Giuseppe Gentile, with a 17.10 on his second attempt (after fouling the first).

The following day in the final, Gentile improved upon his record in the first round, jumping 17.22. In the third round, Viktor Saneyev improved upon the record by one centimeter. In the fifth round Nelson Prudêncio took the lead and the record.

The record lasted for three years until it was improved upon by Pedro Pérez. One year later, Saneyev brought the record with a 17.44 that lasted 3 years. In 1975 in this same stadium, João Carlos de Oliveira made a  "beamonesque" improvement to the record that held for almost 10 years. The record was brought down to sea level by Willie Banks in 1985.

During the competition, five men exceeded the previous world record though Nikolay Dudkin's jumps were wind aided. Phil May and Szmidt jumped further than his Olympic record in sixth and seventh place respectively.

Background

This was the 16th appearance of the event, which is one of 12 athletics events to have been held at every Summer Olympics. Returning finalists from the 1964 Games were gold medalist Józef Szmidt of Poland, bronze medalist Vitold Kreyer of the Soviet Union, fourth-place finisher Ira Davis of the United States, seventh-place finisher Manfred Hinze of the United Team of Germany, ninth-place finisher Ian Tomlinson of Australia, and twelfth-place finisher Fred Alsop of Great Britain. Szmidt had won the European championship again in 1962 and would have been the favorite but for a recent knee surgery that made his ability to repeat questionable.

The Bahamas, Hong Kong, Madagascar, Romania, and Senegal each made their first appearance in the event. The United States competed for the 16th time, having competed at each of the Games so far.

Competition format

The competition consisted of two rounds, qualification and final. In qualification, each athlete jumped three times. At least the top twelve athletes moved on to the final; if more than twelve reached the qualifying distance of 16.10 metres, all who did so advanced. Distances were reset for the final round. Finalists jumped three times, after which the eight best jumped three more times (with the best distance of the six jumps counted).

Records

Prior to the competition, the existing World and Olympic records were as follows.

The following new world and Olympic records were set during this competition.

Schedule

All times are Central Standard Time (UTC-6)

Results

Qualifying

Qual. rule: qualification standard 16.10m (Q) or at least best 12 qualified (q).

Final

References

External links
 Official Olympic Report, la84foundation.org. Retrieved August 13, 2012.

Athletics at the 1968 Summer Olympics
Triple jump at the Olympics
Men's events at the 1968 Summer Olympics